Gorur Parbat is a mountain of the Garhwal Himalaya in Uttarakhand India. It is situated just outside of the northern rim of Nanda Devi Sanctuary. It is joint 88th highest located entirely within the Uttrakhand. Nanda Devi, is the highest mountain in this category. It lies 3.1 km SSE of Lampak I . Rishi Pahar  lies 8.6 km SSE and it is 6.6 km NNW of Hardeol . It lies 4.5 km NW of Tirsuli West .

Climbing history
A four member team of "JUNIPERS" an association of nature lovers from Calcutta led by Prasanta Roy, Arnab Banerjee as climbing leader, Arka Ghosh, Avijit Das and Surinder Singh Rawat as HAS. Had the first ascent on Gorur Dome (6202 m) on 9 June, 1998. and reconnaissance of Gorur Parvat (6504 m) and Gorur forked peak were made. The first exploration of Gorur glacier, a tributary of the main Bagini Bamak.

Neighboring and subsidiary peaks
Neighboring or subsidiary peaks of Gorur Parbat:
 Nanda Devi: 
 Lampak II 
 Uja Tirche 
 Chalab 
 Hardeol: 
 Changabang:

Glaciers and rivers
Kalla Bank Glacier on the west side which drains down to Dhauli Ganga near Jumma. Siruanch Glacier on the east side which drains down to Girthi Ganga which later joins Dhauliganga near Mallari and Bagini Glacier on the SW also drains down to Dhauli Ganga which later joins Alaknanda River at Vishnu Prayag an 82 km journey from its mouth. Alaknanda river is one of the main tributaries of river Ganga which later joins the other main tributaries Bhagirathi river at Dev Prayag and called Ganga there after.

See also

 List of Himalayan peaks of Uttarakhand

References

Mountains of Uttarakhand
Six-thousanders of the Himalayas
Geography of Chamoli district